Valsøyfjord is a village in Trøndelag county, Norway. The village is located along the Arasvikfjorden, just west of the Valsøyfjorden. The European route E39 highway runs through the village, just west of the Valsøy Bridge. There are about 800 people living in Valsøyfjord and the area surrounding the local Valsøyfjorden, and most of the people are working in agriculture and public services.

References

Heim, Norway
Villages in Trøndelag